Mohsen Rabikhah (born 24 December 1987) is an Iranian footballer who plays for Aluminium Arak in Persian Gulf Pro League as a defensive midfielder.

Club career
Rabikhah made his professional debut with Pas Hamedan in the Persian Gulf Pro League. He signed with Tractor in 2013, after an unsuccessful season with Tractor, Rabiekhah left for Azadegan League side Sanat Naft Abadan. After two good seasons with Sanat, Rabiekhah signed Persepolis.

In 2017 Rabikhah was named man of the match by the Persian League for defending an aggressive attack by Saudi Arabia's Al Ahli team.

Rabikhah suffered a torn anterior cruciate ligament in his left knee in the match against Pars Jonoubi, sidelined for six months. In an interview with the official media of Persepolis Club, Dr. Alireza Haghighat stated about the latest condition of the team midfielder: Mohsen Rabikhah felt discomfort in the sole of his foot and was sent for further examinations to have an MRI.

He continued: "In response to detailed tests, it was determined that a bone in the sole of Rabikhah's foot was broken, and thus this player will be out of action for three to four weeks."  He will train under the supervision of the medical staff and we will try to get him back to group training as soon as possible.

Mohsen Rabiekhah was not noticed by the head coach of Persepolis after his injury and left the team and joined Arak Aluminum.Rabikhah injured from the foot (thin leg) in dealing with the opposing player in the 4th minute of the Arak Aluminum team's match against Peykan, and according to the team's medical team, he could not accompany the team until further notice.

Club career statistics

Honours
Persepolis
Persian Gulf Pro League (4): 2016–17, 2017–18, 2018–19, 2019–20
Iranian Super Cup (3): 2017, 2018, 2019
Hazfi Cup (1): 2018–19
AFC Champions League runner-up: 2018

References

External links 

 Mohsen Rabikhah at Persianleague
 Mohsen Rabikhah on Instagram
perspolis on Instagram
Aluminium Arak F.C. on Instagram
Football Federation Islamic Republic of Iran on Instagram

1987 births
Living people
Iranian footballers
Persian Gulf Pro League players
PAS Hamedan F.C. players
Tractor S.C. players
Sanat Naft Abadan F.C. players
Persepolis F.C. players
Aluminium Arak players
Sportspeople from Tehran
Association football fullbacks
Association football utility players